Miłodróż  is a village in the administrative district of Gmina Stara Biała, within Płock County, Masovian Voivodeship, in east-central Poland.

Etymology
The name Milodróz comes from the old Polish male name Milodrog.

Geography

History
After the Partition of the Polish–Lithuanian Commonwealth, the district was part of the area annexed by Prussia.
In October 1939 the Nazi occupation transferred the district to be part of the Zichenau (region) of East Prussia. The area was restored to Poland following the conquests of the Red Army.

In the years 1975–1998, the town was administratively part of the Plock province.
At the 2011 census the population of the village was 102, and the post code is 09-412 .

The town is located at 52°39'24?N 19°39'37?E

References

Villages in Płock County